Mao County or Maoxian (Qiang: ʂqini) is a county in Ngawa Prefecture, Sichuan Province, China.

It has an area of 3,903 and a population of 106,700 as of 2006. 88.9% of the population are Qiang people. The county seat is Fengyi.

Natural disasters
In 1933, an earthquake occurred near Diexi.

In 2017, a landslide occurred in Xinmo Village, Diexi.

Administrative divisions
Mao County has 9 towns and 12 townships.

Towns:
Diexi
Dongxing
Fengyi – Seat of the Mao County People's Government
Fushun
Guangming
Nanxin
Taiping
Tumen
Yadu

Townships:
Baixi
Feihong
Goukou
Heihu
Huilong
Qugu
Sanlong
Shidaguan
Songpinggou
Wadi
Weimen
Yonghe

Transport
 China National Highway 213

Climate

References

County-level divisions of Sichuan
Ngawa Tibetan and Qiang Autonomous Prefecture